Colchester County is a county in the Canadian province of Nova Scotia. With a population of 51,476 the county is the fourth largest in Nova Scotia.  Colchester County is located in north central Nova Scotia.

The majority of the county is governed by the Municipality of the County of Colchester, the county also is home to two independent incorporated towns, Stewiacke and Truro, two village commissions in Bible Hill and Tatamagouche, and the Millbrook 27 First Nations reserve.

History
The glaciers began their retreat from in the Maritimes approximately 13,500 years ago.  The earliest evidence of Palaeo-Indian settlement in the region follows rapidly after deglaciation.  The record of continuous habitation through the paleo and archaic period over ten thousand years culminated in the development of the culture, traditions, and language now known as the Mi'kmaq. For several thousand years the territory of the province has been a part of the territory of the Mi'kmaq nation of Mi'kma'ki. Mi'kma'ki includes what is now the Maritimes, parts of Maine, Newfoundland and the Gaspé Peninsula.  Colchester County is located in the traditional Mi'kmaw districts of Sipekni'katik to the south and west, and Epekwitk aq Piktuk to the north and east.

French colonization of the area began during the 1680s.  Acadian settlers were farmers were accustomed to farming on dyked lands in France.  They used normally salty but fertile marshes that were found on the banks of the Minas Basin and through the use of dykes and aboiteaux that allowed fresh water to enter but kept out the salt-water tide.

The appellation Colchester was applied in 1780 to the district previously called "Cobequid," and was derived from the town of Colchester in Essex. The old name Cobequid was derived from the Mi'kmaq word "Wagobagitk" meaning "the bay runs far up", in reference to the area surrounding the easternmost inlet of the Minas Basin, a body of water called Cobequid Bay.

The District of Colchester, which was at first part of Halifax County, was established as a county in its own right in 1835.  In 1838 a distinct line of division between Cumberland County and Colchester County was established. Two years later, in 1840, the Township of Parrsboro was divided and part of it annexed to Colchester County. In 1871, the boundaries between the Counties of Hants and Colchester and between the Counties of Halifax and Colchester were established. In 1880 the boundary between the Counties of Halifax and Colchester was revised. Eventually in 1897 a portion of the boundary between the Counties of Colchester and Cumberland was fixed and defined.

The question of the boundary between Colchester and Cumberland Counties was the subject of a Commission of Inquiry established in 1946. The report was filed in the office of the Provincial Secretary and in the office of the Department of Lands and Forests in January 1959. Certified copies of it were sent to the Registrars of Deeds for the Counties of Colchester, Cumberland and Kings.

Government

The Municipality of the County of Colchester is governed by a municipal council composed of a Mayor elected at-large and 11 Councillors elected to represent districts. Municipal Council is responsible oversee the provision of the services of municipal government. Municipal governments in Nova Scotia are Council–manager governments, meaning that the Council provides policy direction and approves the budget, and the Chief Administrative Officer oversees the administrative operations and implement Council's policies. Directly delivered services include services such as fire protection, public works, roads, and water.  The municipality participates in shared services, such as police, solid waste management, library services, and the Rath Eastlink Community Centre.

The municipal operating budget was $29.1 million in 2017/18. The current mayor is Christine Blair. Municipal governments in Nova Scotia are elected every four years and the most recent round of elections took place on October 15, 2016. The provincial legislation that creates and empowers the municipality is the Nova Scotia Municipal Government Act.

While the majority of the land area of county is governed by the Municipal Council of the Municipality of the County of Colchester the county also includes two independently incorporated towns, Stewiacke and Truro, as well as the independently governed Millbrook First Nation. Within the county are also two communities with incorporated village commissions in Bible Hill and Tatamagouche which are a part of the county wide municipality but are created to provide additional village services. Colchester is represented by three ridings in the Nova Scotia House of Assembly and two ridings in Canada's House of Commons.

Communities

Towns
Stewiacke 
Truro

Villages
Bible Hill
Tatamagouche

Unincorporated communities
Manganese Mines

Reserves
Millbrook 27

County municipality and county subdivisions
Municipality of the County of Colchester
Colchester Subdivision A
Colchester Subdivision B
Colchester Subdivision C

Demographics 

Population trend

Mother tongue language (2011)

Ethnic Origin (2006)

Access Routes
Highways and numbered routes that run through the county, including external routes that start or finish at the county limits:

Highways

Trunk Routes

Collector Routes:

External Routes:

See also
 List of municipalities in Nova Scotia
Central Nova Tourist Association — Tourism Association Representing Colchester County.
Black Lake listings within Nova Scotia.

References

External links

County of Colchester website

 
County municipalities in Nova Scotia
1835 establishments in the British Empire